Hayatpur is a village in Gurgaon Mandal, Gurgaon District, Haryana State. Hayatpur is 11.22 km distance from its Mandal Main Town Gurgaon . Hayatpur is 10.88 km distance from its District Main City Gurgaon.  It has a population of about 3872 persons living in around 873 households.
Nearby villages are SikanderPur Badha (1.351 km), Badha (1.352 km), Wazirpur (2.282 km), Harsaru (2.948 km), Garhi Harsaru (3.199 km), Kankrola (3.461 km), Dhorka (3.503 km). Hayatpur is located on IMT road crossing Pataudi road, nearby sectors are 89,94,93 and 91.

See also
 Yaduvanshi Ahirs
 Gurgaon
 Haryana

References 

Villages in Gurgaon district